Elasmias quadrasi is a species of tropical, tree-living, air-breathing, land snails, arboreal pulmonate gastropod mollusks in the family Achatinellidae. This species is found in Guam and Northern Mariana Islands.

References

quadrasi
Fauna of Guam
Fauna of the Northern Mariana Islands
Gastropods described in 1894
Taxonomy articles created by Polbot